Events from the year 1997 in Scotland.

Incumbents 

 Secretary of State for Scotland and Keeper of the Great Seal – Michael Forsyth until 2 May; then Donald Dewar

Law officers 
 Lord Advocate – Lord Mackay of Drumadoon; then Lord Hardie
 Solicitor General for Scotland – Paul Cullen; then Colin Boyd

Judiciary 
 Lord President of the Court of Session and Lord Justice General – Lord Rodger of Earlsferry
 Lord Justice Clerk – Lord Ross, then Lord Cullen
 Chairman of the Scottish Land Court – Lord McGhie

Events 
 22 February – Scientists at the Roslin Institute announce the birth of a cloned sheep named Dolly seven months after the fact.
 31 March – train operating company ScotRail (operated by National Express) begins operation of its passenger service franchise in Scotland as part of the privatisation of British Rail, the last company to be sold.
 April–October – in the Outer Hebrides, the Northern Lighthouse Board constructs a new light on Haskeir with minor lights on Gasker and on Shillay, Monach Islands.
 1 May – UK General Election results in all Conservative MPs in Scotland losing their seats. Edinburgh-born Tony Blair (Labour) becomes Prime Minister of the United Kingdom. Mohammad Sarwar, elected for Labour in Glasgow Govan, becomes the UK's first ever Muslim MP.
 12 June – Isle of Eigg Heritage Trust acquires the island.
 5 August – James Reid is jailed for life for the murder of four-year-old James Ward, whose skull was struck by so many blows with a slater's hammer that it was smashed into fragments, like a jigsaw.
 7 September – Clyde Auditorium opened in Glasgow.
 8 September – the football clubs in the Premier Division decide to split from the Scottish Football League and form the Scottish Premier League from next season.
 11 September – referendum in Scotland on the creation of a national Parliament with devolved powers takes place. Voters back the plans for a national Parliament with limited tax raising powers.
 October – the Grand Theft Auto video game, developed by DMA Design in Dundee, is launched.
 6 November – Labour holds the Paisley South by-election despite a swing of 11.3% to the Scottish National Party.
 18 December – the bill to establish the Scottish Parliament unveiled by Secretary of State for Scotland Donald Dewar.
 December – Valhalla Brewery, the most northerly in Britain, opened on Unst.
 The Island of Stroma is completely depopulated when its lighthouse is automated and its keepers and their families depart.
 Equality Network established to campaign for LGBT rights in Scotland.

Births 
 17 January – Charithra Chandran, actress
 6 May – Duncan Scott, swimmer
 11 August – Sarah Clelland, footballer

Deaths 
 22 January – Billy Mackenzie, singer, by suicide (born 1957)
 29 June – Marjorie Linklater, campaigner for the arts and environment of Orkney (born 1909)
 4 September – Belle Stewart, traditional singer (born 1906)
 Angus McPhee, outsider artist (born 1916)

The arts
 Wigtown and Dalmellington become book towns.
 Anne MacLeod publishes her first poetry collection, Standing by Thistles.

See also 
 1997 in Northern Ireland

References 

 
Scotland
Years of the 20th century in Scotland
1990s in Scotland